St. Mary's Abbey was a former Cistercian abbey located near the junction of Abbey Street and Capel Street in Dublin, Ireland. Its territory stretched from the district known as Oxmanstown down along the River Liffey until it met the sea. It also owned large estates in other parts of Ireland. It was one of several liberties that existed in Dublin since the arrival of the Anglo-Normans in the 12th century, which gave it jurisdiction over its lands.

History 

The abbey was founded by the Irish king Máel Sechnaill mac Máele Ruanaid (died 862) in 846, according to the Annals of the Four Masters. It was originally Benedictine, but in 1139 was given by Malachy O'Morga, the legate of the Pope, to monks belonging to the Congregation of Savigny, which in 1147 joined the Cistercian order.

In 1303, a great part of the abbey and church was destroyed by fire but was reconstructed. However, many of the city records in the chancery stored in the abbey were destroyed. The abbey was one of the largest and richest in Ireland at that time. A series of charters and statutes of the Parliament of Ireland increased its liberties, including the right to claim goods salvaged from shipwrecks on the coast of County Dublin, and the right to deal with their lands in territories controlled by the "hostile Irish" without incurring the usual penalties. 

In 1316, Robert de Nottingham, then Mayor of Dublin, attacked the abbey where the Earl of Ulster, Richard Óg de Burgh, was visiting. De Burgh was suspected of having brought Edward Bruce, who was then marching on Dublin, to Ireland. Several of de Burgh's men were killed before he was captured, and as the monks were suspected of supporting Bruce, the abbey was laid waste.

In the fifteenth century Walter Champfleur became Abbot of St  Mary's in 1467, and held office for more than thirty years. He was a political figure of some importance, due partly to his close association with Thomas Butler, 7th Earl of Ormond, to whom he acted as a political and financial adviser. He was briefly Keeper of the Great Seal of Ireland in 1482-3. He died around 1498, much mourned by his Order as an "aged, prudent and learned man".

Silken Thomas started his rebellion of 1534 here, by throwing down his Sword of State.

Burials in the abbey 
James Butler, 4th Earl of Ormond

Abbey became an arsenal 
After the Dissolution of the Monasteries in 1539 the property was given over to John Travers and the church became an arsenal and part of a quarry. The spacious lands which had been owned by the monks came in time to be let to persons who desired to build residences or places of business thereon.

Abbey became a private residence 
In 1619, Sir Gerald Moore of Mellifont, Drogheda, received from King James I of England a grant of the abbey, together with its tithes and lands. He later became Viscount Moore of Mellifont. The family of Moore made the Abbey their Dublin residence up to the close of the 17th century, and it was Henry Moore, 1st Earl of Drogheda, who built himself a mansion on what is now O'Connell Street and developed Henry, Moore and Earl streets.

In 1676, the stones of the Abbey were used for the building of Essex Bridge (now Grattan Bridge, leading to Parliament St.).

Abbey lands became Glasnevin Cemetery 

Dr.Charles Lindsay (Charles Dalrymple Lindsay), Dean of Christ Church Cathedral, Dublin 1804–46 and afterwards Bishop of Kildare, acquired the old monastic lands of Glasnevin, which had once belonged to the abbey. These were purchased around 1832 to form what is now Glasnevin Cemetery.

Re-discovery 
The abbey was only rediscovered, 7 feet (2 m) underground and underneath a bakery, in the 1880s, by an amateur archaeologist. His findings were publicized by John Thomas Gilbert. Parts of the old adjoining walls can still be seen. The building is now in the care of Heritage Ireland. The Chapter House is ordinarily open to visitors, by descending a stone staircase.  the site is closed until further notice.

See also 
 List of abbeys and priories in Ireland (County Dublin)

References

Sources 
Primary
  (2 volumes; Volume 2 on Internet Archive)
 

Secondary

Citations

External links 
Heritage Ireland web page about the abbey
History Ireland webpage about the abbey, from a 2011 issue of the magazine

Religious buildings and structures completed in 862
Buildings and structures in Dublin (city)
Benedictine monasteries in the Republic of Ireland
Cistercian monasteries in the Republic of Ireland
Former churches in the Republic of Ireland
National Monuments in County Dublin
9th-century establishments in Ireland
Abbey Street